West Coast Environmental Law is an environmental law and public advocacy organization based in Vancouver, British Columbia, Canada that works to shape environmental policies in British Columbia and in Canada. It is known for its involvement in green communities, climate change, energy, forests and land use, aboriginal law, and environmental assessment. The organization also provides free legal advice regarding environmental issues, and it provides grants through its Environmental Dispute Resolution Fund to individuals or groups seeking legal representation to resolve an environmental conflict. West Coast Environmental Law also monitors developments in British Columbian and Canadian environmental policy, and distributes this information to the public through various online channels.

History

West Coast Environmental Law was founded in 1974 and is the oldest environmental law organization in British Columbia, Canada.  It was established to promote the cause of environmental law reform and to empower citizens so that they could work together to bring about progressive change. For much of its history, it has been engaged directly in law reform, legal education and test case litigation. In the late 1980s, it was determined that a stand-alone environmental law organization, which would devote itself primarily to test case litigation, was required.  As a result, West Coast Environmental Law played an active role in the establishment of Sierra Legal Defence Fund, now known as Ecojustice Canada, to take the lead in using test litigation to defend and protect the environment. West Coast Environmental Law, in turn, narrowed its focus to drafting and advancing legislative reform initiatives and providing public legal education. From 1990 to present, West Coast Environmental Law and Ecojustice Canada have avoided duplication by cooperating and coordinating on areas of potential overlap and having distinct market niches.

Notable achievements

West Coast Environmental Law has played a role in several environmental legislative initiatives in Candada. 

 Played a role in the developing the Canadian Environmental Assessment Act and the Canadian Environmental Protection Act. 
 Represented the Peace Valley Environmental Association at hearings on the controversial Site C dam.
 Worked as part of a delegation to help negotiate the Kyoto Protocol.
 Negotiated the amendments that resulted in the protection of the Great Bear Rainforest.
 Helped to draft the "good wood" certification standard for British Columbia, which independently verifies that wood products come from forests that are managed in an ecologically and socially responsible way.

Areas of work

West Coast Environmental Law specializes in areas dealing with green communities, climate change, energy, forests and land use, aboriginal law, and environmental assessment.

Green communities Work in this area is focused on reducing urban impacts, strengthening local government environmental by-laws, policies and practices, and advancing community livability and sustainability through strategic use of the law and law reform.
Climate change Work in this area is focused on creating a legislative framework that will allow British Columbia and Canada to do its part to protect and sustain the Earth's atmosphere.
Energy Work in this area is focused on reducing greenhouse gas emissions by working on projects that shift away from the reliance on fossil fuels and towards sustainable renewable energy sources.
Forests and land use Work in this area is focused on transforming the way rights and responsibilities about land use are understood in British Columbia – creating new legal mechanisms for resource tenures (licenses) and land use decision-making that are more democratic, sustainable and just.
Aboriginal law Work in this area is focused on providing legal and strategic advice to First Nations and First Nations political organizations, including crafting law reform solutions that address Aboriginal Title and Rights and foster ecological and cultural sustainability.:
Environmental assessment Work in this area focuses on law and policy reform discussions at both the federal and provincial levels, and works on a number of fronts to advance its law reform objectives.

Environmental Legal Aid

West Coast Environmental Law provides legal information and advice to members of the public who are facing an environmental problem. In some cases, it will provide brief legal opinions or letters where doing so has the potential to achieve an important environmental result.

Environmental Dispute Resolution Fund

West Coast Environmental Law provides grants through its Environmental Dispute Resolution Fund to individuals or groups who need to hire legal representation to resolve an environmental problem. The Environmental Dispute Resolution Fund is the only source of environmental legal aid in British Columbia and is used to hire lawyers at a legal aid rate.   

Since 1989, when the Environmental Dispute Resolution Fund was established, it has provided over $4 million in grants, which have aided in more than 500 legal cases in British Columbia. Marine biologist and fish farm activist Alexandra Morton used funding from West Coast Environmental Law to challenge the constitutionality of allowing fish farms in British Columbia.  In another such case, a group of citizens known as Coal Watch used funding from West Coast Environmental Law to oppose a proposed coal mine located in Baynes Sound in Vancouver Island.

Public information

West Coast Environmental Law tracks and analyzes developments in British Columbian and Canadian environmental policy and distributes this information to the public through its Environmental Law Alert Blog, monthly Legal E-Brief newsletter, and Facebook, Twitter, and YouTube pages.

See also
 Canadian Environmental Law Association
 Ecojustice Canada
 Environmental Dispute Resolution Fund

References

External links
 

Environmental organizations based in British Columbia
Legal organizations based in British Columbia
Legal advocacy organizations based in Canada
Environmental law in Canada